The Palace Theater is a 2,900-seat auditorium at 100 East Main Street in downtown Waterbury, Connecticut.  The theater currently presents a variety of live entertainment, hosting traveling productions and locally produced events.  It was built in 1921 to a Renaissance Revival design by Thomas W. Lamb, and is an architecturally prominent element of the city's downtown.  It underwent a major restoration in the early 21st century, and is listed on the National Register of Historic Places.

Architecture
The Palace Theater is located in downtown Waterbury, on the south side of East Main Street, east of the city green. The entrance sheltered by a large marquee that projects over the sidewalk. The upper levels of the four-story building are organized into eight bays, with the center six having the most elaborate treatment. The second floor has bands of three windows in each of these bays, and is separated from the upper two floors by a cornice. The upper bays have two-story round-arch windows, flanked by round columns and separated from each other by Corinthian pilasters. A frieze band and cornice cap the building. The interior lobby and auditorium spaces are richly decorated.

History
The theater was built in 1922 to a design by Thomas W. Lamb, one of the foremost designers of theaters of the period.  When it opened, it was judged to be the city's finest performance venue, hosting traveling vaudeville shows and the latest movies.  It was part of the business empire of Sylvester Z. Poli, who controlled as many as thirty theaters, most in the northeastern United States.  Only two of Poli's theaters survive in some form, and this one is exceptionally well preserved.  The theater closed in 1987, and stood shuttered for eighteen years.  It was given a $30 million restoration completed by the Tomasso Group and reopened in 2004.

See also
National Register of Historic Places listings in New Haven County, Connecticut

References

External links
Palace Theater website

National Register of Historic Places in New Haven County, Connecticut
Movie palaces
Theatres on the National Register of Historic Places in Connecticut
Theatres completed in 1921
Renaissance Revival architecture in Connecticut
Theatres in Connecticut
Tourist attractions in New Haven County, Connecticut
Buildings and structures in Waterbury, Connecticut
1921 establishments in Connecticut
Thomas W. Lamb buildings